Dovid Raskin (1927–2011) was a rabbi associated with the Chabad-Lubavitch Hasidic movement. He served as chairman of the Lubavitch Youth Organization for over 50 years. He also served on the boards of a number of Chabad's central organizations.

Biography
Rabbi Raskin was born in Babruysk, Belarus in 1927. In 1955, Rabbi Menachem Mendel Schneerson appointed Raskin as to the board of directors for the newly founded Lubavitch Youth Organization. Raskin was later appointed as chairman, a position he held until his death on May 10, 2011.

Raskin was also a faculty member of the United Lubavitcher Yeshivoth and was appointed to the boards of Chabad-Lubavitch's central organization including Agudas Chasidei Chabad, Merkos L’Inyonei Chinuch, Mahane Israel (Chabad), as well as Beth Rivkah girls school.

Torah dedication
In 2018 a Sefer Torah was dedicated in Raskin's memory.

References 

Chabad-Lubavitch rabbis
American Hasidic rabbis
1927 births
2011 deaths